Lycophidion is a genus of nonvenomous lamprophiid snakes commonly referred to as the wolf snakes.  there are 23 recognized species in the genus.

Description and behavior
Wolf snakes are small snakes which forage at night for sleeping lizards. They have flat heads and large recurved teeth that are assumed to aid them in their extraction of lizards from their lairs.

Reproduction
All species in the genus Lycophidion are oviparous and lay between 3 and 10 eggs.

Species
The following species are recognized as being valid.

Lycophidion acutirostre 
Lycophidion albomaculatum 
Lycophidion capense 
Lycophidion chirioi 
Lycophidion depressirostre 
Lycophidion helmichi 
Lycophidion irroratum 
Lycophidion jacksoni  — western Jackson's wolf snake
Lycophidion laterale 
Lycophidion meleagre 
Lycophidion multimaculatum 
Lycophidion namibianum 
Lycophidion nanum 
Lycophidion nigromaculatum 
Lycophidion ornatum 
Lycophidion pembanum 
Lycophidion pygmaeum 
Lycophidion semiannule 
Lycophidion semicinctum 
Lycophidion taylori 
Lycophidion tchadensis  — Chad wolf snake
Lycophidion uzungwense 
Lycophidion variegatum 

Nota bene: A binomial authority in parentheses indicates that the species was originally described in a genus other than Lycophidion.

References

Further reading
Branch, Bill (2004). Field Guide to Snakes and other Reptiles of Southern Africa. Third Revised edition, Second impression. Sanibel Island, Florida: Ralph Curtis Books. 399 pp. . (Genus Lycophidion, p. 76).
Fitzinger L (1843). Systema Reptilium, Fasciculus Primus, Amblyglossae. Vienna: Braumüller & Seidel. 106 pp. + indices. (Lycophidion, new genus, p. 27). (in Latin).

Lamprophiidae
Snake genera
Taxa named by Leopold Fitzinger